The Copa del Rey is a football competition held in Spain.

Copa del Rey may also refer to:
Copa del Rey de Baloncesto, Spain's basketball cup
Copa del Rey de Voleibol, Spain's volleyball cup
Copa del Rey de Balonmano, Spain's handball cup
Copa del Rey de Waterpolo, Spain's water polo cup
Copa del Rey de Futsal, Spain's futsal cup
Copa del Rey de Rugby, Spain's rugby union cup
Copa del Rey de Hockey Patines, Spain's rink hockey cup
Copa del Rey de Hockey Hierba, Spain's field hockey cup
Copa del Rey Juvenil de Fútbol, Spain's U19 football cup

See also
 King's Cup (disambiguation)
 Coupe du Roi, a Spa24 title